James "Pate" Philip State Park, originally known as Tri-County State Park, is an Illinois state park in DuPage County and Kane County, Illinois, United States.

The park is named after James "Pate" Philip, a Republican politician.

Bartlett Nature Center
Bartlett Nature Center is located in the park's visitor center and is operated by the Bartlett Park District.  The center features natural history displays in its museum and offers environmental education programs for schools, scouts and other groups.

References

External links
 
 Bartlett Nature Center - Bartlett Park District

State parks of Illinois
Protected areas of Kane County, Illinois
Bartlett, Illinois
Protected areas established in 1991
Protected areas of DuPage County, Illinois
Nature centers in Illinois
1991 establishments in Illinois